Thomas Rowney (30 April 1668 – 31 August 1727) was a British Tory politician who sat in the English House of Commons between 1695 and 1708 and in the British House of Commons from 1708 to 1722.

Early life
Rowney was baptised on 31 April 1668. He was the only surviving son of Thomas Rowney, of St Giles, London by his second wife, Catherine Bateman (d. 1705). His father, the son of a minor Worcestershire gentleman, had first settled in Oxford around 1650, setting up practice as an attorney. He married the widow of a fellow lawyer which enhanced his wealth and standing, and he acquired considerable property in Oxford's outlying parishes.

He was educated at Shilton, near Burford, in Oxfordshire, in a small school which produced at the same time a Lord High Treasurer (Lord Oxford and Mortimer), a Lord High Chancellor (Lord Harcourt) and a Lord Chief Justice of the Common Pleas (Lord Trevor).

He then matriculated at St John's College, Oxford in 1684. He entered the Inner Temple in 1686, and was called to the bar in 1694.

Career
He served as High Sheriff of Oxfordshire from 1691 to 1692. In 1694, he succeeded to his father's extensive landed property outside Oxford, less than two months after qualifying as a barrister. "His wealth was considerable, by 1721 comprising landholdings in Berkshire, Warwickshire, Worcestershire, and including ancestral lands at Great Hurdington in Gloucestershire where he remained a magistrate after 1714."

For most of his adult life, Rowney was a prominent and much-respected figure in Oxford. and was well acquainted with senior Tory politicians and university dons. In August 1717, the corporation elected him to the ancient office of "barge commissioner," which was reserved for eminent citizens. He was instrumental in the rebuilding of Oxford Town Hall, and his son Thomas saw its completion in 1751.

Political career
In the election of 1695, Rowney stood for Oxford. He was put up on the Tory slate, likely at the bidding of the 1st Earl of Abingdon, and "was elected after several weeks of bitter campaigning, during which a Whig mob once came close to attacking his house in St. Giles parish." Rowney was returned unopposed in the first election of 1701. Rowney sat for Oxford until 1722 when he was succeeded by his eldest son, Thomas.

Personal life
He married, by license dated 27 May 1691, Elizabeth Noel (d. 1730), a daughter of Edward Noel of St Clement Danes, London. Rowney spent most of his time within the city, where his house, which was extensively rebuilt and finished in 1702, was considered one of the finest. Together, they were the parents of three sons and one daughter, including:  

 Thomas Rowney (–1759), who married Ms. Trollope in 1756.
 Elizabeth Rowney, who married Sir Clobery Noel, 5th Baronet, of Kirkby Mallory, in 1714.

Rowney died on 31 August 1727 and was buried in the parish church of St Giles, Oxford.

References

External links
Thomas Rowney the Elder (1668–1727), High Sheriff of Oxfordshire (1691), MP for Oxford (1695–1722) by Peter Lely

1668 births
1727 deaths
Members of the Parliament of Great Britain for English constituencies
English MPs 1695–1698
English MPs 1698–1700
English MPs 1701
English MPs 1701–1702
English MPs 1702–1705
English MPs 1705–1707
British MPs 1708–1710
British MPs 1710–1713
British MPs 1713–1715
British MPs 1715–1722
Members of the Inner Temple
Alumni of St John's College, Oxford
High Sheriffs of Oxfordshire